Argenteuil is a commune in the northwestern suburbs of Paris, France. It can also refer to:

Places
In Canada:
 Argenteuil Regional County Municipality, in southern Quebec
 Argenteuil County, Quebec, an historic county in southwestern Quebec, replaced by above
 Argenteuil—Papineau—Mirabel, a federal electoral district in Quebec
 Argenteuil (electoral district), a former federal electoral district in Quebec, replaced by above
 Argenteuil—La Petite-Nation, the federal riding to replace Argenteuil—Papineau—Mirabel in 2015
 Argenteuil (provincial electoral district), a provincial electoral district in Quebec
 Argenteuil, a historic district in the Province of Canada
 Saint-André-d'Argenteuil, a municipality in the Laurentides region of Quebec

In France:
 Arrondissement of Argenteuil, an arrondissement in the Val-d'Oise département
 Argenteuil-sur-Armançon, a commune in the Yonne department in Burgundy in north-central France
 Gare d'Argenteuil, a rail station in Argenteuil, Paris
 Les Églises-d'Argenteuil, a commune in the Charente-Maritime department in France

In Belgium:
 A castle near Waterloo, Belgium

Art
 Several paintings based on or named after Argenteuil, France, including
 Argenteuil (Manet), a painting by Édouard Manet
 Argenteuil Basin with a Single Sailboat, a painting by French Impressionist artist Claude Monet